In marketing, a company’s value proposition is the full mix of benefits or economic value which it promises to deliver to the current and future customers (i.e., a market segment) who will buy their products and/or services. It is part of a company's overall marketing strategy which differentiates its brand and fully positions it in the market. A value proposition can apply to an entire organization, or parts thereof, or customer accounts, or products or services. 

A value proposition can be written as a business or marketing statement (called a "positioning statement") which summarizes why a consumer should buy a product or use a service. A compellingly worded positioning statement has the potential to convince a prospective consumer that a particular product or service the company offers will add more value or better solve a problem (i.e. the "pain-point") for them than other similar offerings will, thus turning them into a paying client. The positioning statement usually contains references to which sector the company is operating in, what products or services they are selling, who are its target clients and which points differentiate it from other brands and make its product or service a superior choice for those clients. It is usually communicated to the customers via the company's website and other advertising and marketing materials. 

Creating a value proposition is a part of the overall business strategy of a company. Kaplan and Norton say "Strategy is based on a differentiated customer value proposition. Satisfying customers is the source of sustainable value creation." Developing a value proposition is based on a review and analysis of the benefits, costs, and value that an organization can deliver to its customers, prospective customers, and other constituent groups within and outside the organization. It is also a positioning of value, where Value = Benefits − Cost (cost includes economic risk).

Viewed from the perspective of two dimensions of performance (quality) and price, there are usually five value propositions upon which companies can position their products or services. Firstly, they can offer the best performing product or service and charge a high price for it (more for more). Secondly, a company can offer a product of a very high performance (compared to the market leader) but at a previous price (more for the same). Thirdly, a company can offer a product with the same existing performance for a lower price (same for less). Fourthly, a company can offer lower quality, worse-performing products for a certain class of customers who have lower performance or quality requirements than the average consumer, but do it at a much lower price (less for much less) Finally, a company can offer better performing product for a lower price than before (more for less), which is ambitious and hard to achieve, as offering more quality usually requires an increase in production cost.

Conversely, a customer's value proposition is the perceived subjective value, satisfaction or usefulness of a product or service (based on its differentiating features and its personal and social values for the customer) delivered to and experienced by the customer when they acquire it. It is the net positive subjective difference between the total benefits they obtain from it and the sum of monetary cost and non-monetary sacrifices (relative benefits offered by other alternative competitive products) which they have to give up in return. However, often there is a discrepancy between what the company thinks about its value proposition and what the clients think it is. 

A company's value propositions can evolve, whereby values can add up over time. For example, Apple's value proposition contains a mix of three values. Originally, in the 1980s, it communicated that its products are creative, elegant and "cool" and thus different from the status quo ("Think different"). Then in the first two decades of the 21st century, it communicated its second value of providing the customers with a reliable, smooth, hassle-free user experience within its ecosystem ("Tech that works"). In the 2020s, Apple's latest differentiating value is the protection of its client's privacy ("Your data is safe with us").

Overview 
A value proposition is a statement which identifies clear, measurable and
demonstrable benefits consumers get when buying a particular product or service. It should convince consumers that this product or service is better than others on the market. This proposition can lead to a competitive advantage when consumers pick that particular product or service over other competitors because they perceive greater value.

The phrase "value proposition" (VP) is credited to Michael Lanning and Edward Michaels, who first used the term in a 1988 staff paper for the consulting firm McKinsey and co. In the paper, which was titled "a business is a value delivery system", the authors define value proposition as "a clear, simple statement of the benefits, both tangible and intangible, that the company will provide, along with the approximate price it will charge each customer segment for those benefits". In a modern, clear-cut definition, Labeaux defines a value proposition as a statement that clearly identifies what benefits a customer will receive by purchasing a particular product or service from a vendor. According to Hassan, however, there is no specific definition for value proposition.

Creating and delivering value proposition is a significant issue that marketing planners need to consider in planning strategies. Value propositions vary across industries and across different market segments within an industry. Capon and Hulbert linked the success of firms in the marketplace to the value provided to customers. They introduced a principle of customer value, with customer insights driving the company's marketing activities. Customer value should also drive investment and production decisions, because customers perceive value on the benefits of the product or service they receive. Consequently, as the environment changes, and the customer experience and their desires change, the value they seek changes. As a result, companies are pressured to invest more resources in marketing research; allowing them to gain deep customer insights and, thus, improve value proposition.

Consumers are always looking around for the best possible deal at the best quality and how these products or services will contribute to their success.  The value proposition is the promise that the business will give the consumer to assure best possible value.  The value proposition is a creative statement that depicts the unique selling point. Without this statement you lose an opportunity to tell consumers why they should pick you over competitors. An important goal in a business is to convince customers that they are getting many more benefits. Coming from a customer's perspective, buyers are not only asking how this product is different to one they may already be using, but what value this product or service may have.  Customers are looking for answers that may improve or replace products or services. Customers will never buy a product or service if they don't feel like they are receiving the best possible deal. Therefore, the value proposition is important to businesses and their success.

The value proposition is to differentiate the brand from competitors. To understand and get an idea about the value proposition it is important to analyze the business through the marketing mix: identifying what the product or service is, the price of the product or service, where this will be sold, and how this product or service will be promoted. Identifying these key questions helps clarify and make the value proposition more obvious. Another strategy that has been used to help process learning and growth of a business is the balanced scorecard. This concept was developed by Robert Kaplan and David Norton in 1990, to help communicate value proposition in a way that businesses can understand. The maps create a visual representation of the businesses objectives and goals so it becomes more approachable. Through these theories the proposition becomes more obvious and displays to consumers why this product or service is so special to the market.  Once businesses determine what makes this item or service so exceptional compared to competitors, it can begin to guide a business more clearly. This can lead to marketing concepts and ideas.  The value proposition helps the business understand what their primary focus and goals are within the business and help to understand the consumer's needs.

When creating a value proposition it is important to think about these key questions: What is the product or service? Who is the target market? What value does the product or service provide? How is this different from competitors? Many businesses that can answer these will have a relatively strong value proposition as they know how their product or service differentiates from competitors.  But it is more than just understanding and recognising what makes them different; it is about creating a statement that engages customers to purchase goods or service. There are many benefits that the value proposition can have on a business. These benefits include a strong differentiation between the company and its competitors, increase in quantity, better operations efficiency and increase in revenue. By also creating a more personal and honest relationship with consumers through the value proposition also gives them another reason to choose you.  These benefits will help the business grow and succeed in the market.

Value-focused enterprise model 
Creating a value-focused enterprise (VFE) requires a fundamental rethink of the way things are organized and managed. This is at the heart of the business strategy and implementation. These customers demand, and are willing to pay for, a sales effort that creates new value and provides additional benefits outside of the product. Using this model, you are able to plan the business on the basis of value to be delivered.
 Value-centered strategic intent: Where do you intend the organization to be in the foreseeable future and what principles will guide the journey?
 Value proposition: What is the Value Proposition (market, Value experience, Offerings, Benefits, Alternatives and Differentiation and Proof) and how is it congruent with the Strategic Intent?
 Value-focused operating model: What are the ‘How' factors (organization, process and so on) for the operationalization of the Value Proposition to achieve the strategic Intent?
 Value-creation-based management and execution: How will you execute and manage all of this to ensure maximum Value Delivery.

The value cycle 
Value proposition is by definition what the company offer differs from its competitors and explains why the customers buy from the company. Furthermore, it defines the relationship between: the performance attributes of products or services, the fulfillment of the needs of particular customers and the total cost. Osterwalder and Pigneur state that the value proposition must be studied through its entire value life cycle. Value elements can be created in each of the five stages of the value life cycle. These stages are: value creation, value appropriation, value consumption, value renewal and value transfer:

 Value creation: The value creation can be best described as a set of interdependent activities that add value for the customers to the company products and services. The traditional view of the value creation process doesn't allow customers to take part in feeling the value. Marketing and research and development are mainly responsible for adding value at this stage based on historic data and observation. However, in modern times, the customers of several companies are included in this stage. Nowadays the stage of value creation is the essential point of any business. Creating value for customers helps the company to sell its products or services, while at the same time it makes the investors happy. Moreover, as the value for the customers increases, the revenues together with the stock prices of the company increase. This guarantees the future access to capital that can be used for future investments and creating even greater value for the customers.
 There are three main components in value creation network:
 Key partners: The companies use the resources, knowledge and capabilities of their partners. The most important partners that a company can have are the owners, employees, suppliers, the government, education institutions, etc.
 Key activities are the activities that needed to be done in order to create a value proposition for the customers from the available resources. It shows all of the crucial activities and links between the company and its partners that are necessary to create value for the customers. 
 Key activities can be divided as: 
 Internal key activities are the activities that are made inside the organisation
 External key activities are the relations between the organisation and its partners
 Key resources are the main assets that are needed in the process of adding value to the product or process for the customers.
 Value appropriation: value can be created in this stage by developing, improving and facilitating customers' buying experience. This can be done in two steps. The first step is improving how transactions are made. In this step, companies are trying to facilitate buying for customers. An example for this can be Amazon.com's one click buying which allows customers to make a purchase using one click. Facilitating purchases of expensive goods can include innovative price negotiation mechanisms, contract management, convenient billing and payment or attractive financing mechanisms.  The second step is improving fulfillment. For some companies, this step is very important and they adjust their whole value proposition to fulfillment.
 Value consumption: This is core to the value proposition. At this stage, customers see and feel the value through the actual use of the product or the service. Value is maximized when value proposition's aspects match the customer's needs.
 Value renewal: In some cases, it is possible to renew value during or after its consumption when value is used up, becomes obsolescent, is dysfunctional or when it expires. Value renewal also includes steadily updating value, where by adding new features to existing value preposition customer value is increased.
 Value transfer: At the last stage of the value cycle, there is a possibility that a customer transfers the acquired value after its consumption. Reason for this might be loss of value in value proposition, or because transfer of value will result in higher benefits for the customer.

Value status 
Perceived value and willingness to pay are correlated. Customers are willing to pay in several circumstances, a few examples being; when they are faced with different offers, when they are in a partnership with the supplier, when the need to buy is urgent, when there aren't any substitutes, and when there is a high positive relationship between the value perceived and the price. Companies must choose the best pricing strategy to deliver value for both the customer and corporate perception. Capon & Hulbert introduced some factors that a firm must consider before making pricing decisions. Some of these factors include:
 Perceived substitutes: differentiation on offers and prices compared to competitors.
 Unique value: customers weigh the benefits and features of the product and perceive these benefits as a unique value provided solely by the organization.
 Price/Quality: firms should consider that customers will seek to have a positive price/quality relationship for a product to make a purchase decision.

Zeithaml studied three consumer defined values: Low price, Quality and value for money, and Features. The study concluded that perceived value is the customer's overall assessment of the utility of a product based on perceptions of what is received and what is given. Some Customers may see value in cheap prices, and other may see value in volume obtained.

The startup literature acknowledges that value is created from providing a solution to a problem. But in The Value Mix, de Ternay argues that value is above all perceived and therefore creating value also depends on addressing human emotions.

Innovation 

It is believed by Lindic and Marques that value proposition is a significant catalyst for customer focused innovation. Kambil and Baragheh claim innovation is a phenomenon that requires a multidisciplinary approach for analysis due to its sheer complexity. Fields such as strategic management, organisational science, and information systems marketing are central to this analysis.

Lindic used the example of Amazon.com; the transformation from an online bookstore to one of the world's most important online shopping services. Amazon.com has evolved through diversification from their struggling brand prior to the internet bubble burst in 2000, allowing for a great example for analysis and explanation of the potential innovation resulting from value proposition.

Amazon also represents the so-called new economy yet at the same time it shares many characteristics with traditional companies. In fact, offline activities represent 70 percent of its core business. As a result, we are able to identify innovations which are common in both traditional and new economy companies. 

 included features like the possibility to search among books based on not only book titles, but also keywords spread throughout the content, reducing the consumers time and energy for finding their desired item. Another  was the patented “one-click” feature, allowing customers to efficiently purchase goods without having to repeatedly submit their payment and shipping information. All of these minor adjustments over time were the result of developing value proposition, ultimately leading to the success that Amazon.com is today.

Lindic has developed a PERFA framework to evaluate this concept of value proposition in regards to innovation. Meticulously matching innovations' effects on customers with existing definitions found in the existing literature led to the following five elements that altogether represent a complete overview of all value propositions generated by innovations at Amazon.com. These are Performance (P), Ease of use (E), Reliability (R), Flexibility (F), and affectivity (A).

Bonner states that the performances of innovations or new goods or services offered to customers is a result of a superior company's offering in terms of quality, technical performance, features and ability to meet customer needs and demands. This perspective emphasises innovation as a generator of performance in a customer-oriented way.

Ease of use refers to the degree to which a person believes that using a particular system or product will be effort-free (e.g. the ease of search and acquisition, usability, personalisation, service, and support). All else being equal, a feature or application perceived as easier to use than another is more likely to be accepted by users, according to Wang. In Tornatzky and Klein's meta-analysis of the relationship between the characteristics of an innovation and its adoption, they found compatibility, relative advantage, and complexity have the most consistent significant relationships across a broad range of innovation types. Complexity is defined as “the degree to which an innovation is perceived as relatively difficult to understand and use”.  Therefore, the easier it is to use an innovative application or feature, the more likely it is to be accepted by the user. Consequently, ease of use reduces the cost included in the value proposition equation and increases its value.

Reliability is defined as “the ability to perform the promised service dependably and accurately” according to Pitt. Raaij and Pruyn similarly perceive reliability as the ability of a product to deliver according to its specifications. Innovation may, therefore, add to the value proposition for customers by performing in accordance with the standard set for products and services.

Flexibility is perceived as necessary in order to maintain the fit of an organisation and a changing environment. It describes a firm's ability to reallocate and reconfigure its organisational resources, processes and strategies as a response to environmental changes. In other words, flexibility is materialised through the dynamic capabilities of a company which enable it to integrate, build and reconfigure internal and external competencies in order to face rapidly changing environments.

Affectivity addresses the feelings or emotions associated with working with a company or using its products and services. Atken states it is highly correlated with a sense of belonging to a certain group or class. It is also correlated with the concept of co-branding, where a brand or company may be associated with the attributes of the product or benefits derived from it. Such a brand generates emotions and feelings among its customers.

Kambil argues that the value proposition concept is too vague to be useful for innovation; however, Lindic and Marques' research indicates that if systematically decomposed, the value proposition holds a vital role in the innovation process.

It is customers who decide whether or not to purchase a certain product; therefore, innovations should be based on what customers truly value. A value-focused approach requires managers to rethink their perspective on innovation by placing themselves in the customer's shoes. In doing so, managers are able to identify key factors among the five perspectives of PERFA and make better decisions when deciding what to innovate so as to improve value proposition for their customers.

Strategy and marketing 
Businesses can use the value proposition to not only target customers, but partners, employees and suppliers. The creative statement should be able to persuade other businesses to create an alliance, which will be helpful in the long run. Joining up with another business can be a very powerful strategy. When businesses align their strengths seem to stand out, and their weaknesses become less noticeable. This makes their products and services stand out to consumers. Creating an alliance with another firm can increase a businesses brand awareness; create a larger customer base, new insights on products and access to new technologies to improve how the business runs. This strategy creates a competitive advantage over other competitors.

The value proposition should be able to influence new employees or motivate existing employees to support the businesses goals and plans. Employees can improve the business client base and build a stronger relationship. Treating employees well, by offering bonuses or special deals they are more likely to take on more responsibility and promote the business they work for. This alliance within the business can promote products or services through word of mouth or social media. The employee's positive attitude towards workforce and products will interest new customers.

Suppliers should want to supply the business with products or items needed for the service by their thoughtful and creative statement. Businesses can increase their chances of the products they want and when they want it.  By thinking of a well-constructed well-thought-out value proposition it can lead to a very successful business. This can lead to possible alliances with suppliers that will support and help the firm with supplies and products that are needed to help improve the position of the business.

See also 
 Customer value proposition
 Employee value proposition
 Value added

Footnotes

References 

Kambil, A., Ginsberg, A. and Bloch, M. (1996), "Re-inventing value propositions", Working Paper IS-96-21, New York University, New York, NY.
Barnes, C., Blake, H. and Pinder, D. (2009), Creating and Delivering Your Value Proposition: Managing Customer Experience for Profit, Kogan Page, London
Wang, W.T. and Wang, C.C. (2009), "An empirical study of instructor adoption of web-based learning systems", Computers & Education, Vol. 53 No. 3, pp. 761–74.
Van Raaij, W.F. and Pruyn, A.T. (1998), "Customer control and evaluation of service validity and reliability", Psychology and Marketing, Vol. 15 No. 8, pp. 811–32
Pitt, L.F., Watson, R.T. and Kavan, C.B. (1995), "Service quality: a measure of information systems effectiveness", MIS Quarterly, Vol. 19 No. 2, pp. 173–87.
Atkin, D. (2004), The Culting of Brands: When Customers Become True Believers, Portfolio, New York, NY.
Tornatzky, L.G. and Klein, K.J. (1982), "Innovation characteristics and innovation adoption-implementation: a meta-analysis of findings", IEEE Transactions on Engineering Management, Vol. 29 No. 1, pp. 28–45.
Capon, N., & Hulbert, J. (2007). Managing Marketing in the 21st Century: Developing & Implementing the Market Strategy. Wessex, Inc.
Hassan, A. (2012), "The Value Proposition Concept in Marketing: How Customers Perceive the Value Delivered by Firms", International Journal of Marketing Studies, Vol. 4, No. 3.
Osterwalder, A. & Pigneur, Y. (2003), "Modeling Value Propositions in e-business", ICEC '03 Proceedings of the 5th international conference on Electronic Commerce, pp 429–436
Zeithaml, V. (1988). "Consumer Perceptions of Price, Quality, and Value: A Means-end Model and Synthesis of Evidence". Journal of Marketing 52 (3). American Marketing Association: 2–22. doi:10.2307/1251446.

 
Business terms
Strategic management